HMNZS Taupo is a Lake-class inshore patrol vessel of the Royal New Zealand Navy. Taupo was delivered to the Ministry of Defence on the 28 May 2009 and commissioned into the Royal New Zealand Navy on 29 May 2009. Taupo is the third ship of this name to serve in the Royal New Zealand Navy and is named after Lake Taupo.

See also
 Patrol boats of the Royal New Zealand Navy

External links 

Taupo (official website, Royal New Zealand Navy)

Protector-class inshore patrol vessels
2008 ships
Patrol vessels of New Zealand